Francisco José Pacheco Torres (born 27 March 1982) is a Spanish former professional road bicycle racer. In 2005, he came third in the Spanish time trial championship for amateurs. He also finished third overall in the Vuelta a Cordoba. In the 2006 season, he won two stages at the Vuelta an Alicante and he finished third at the Trofeo Guerrita. Later, he had won a section in each of the Vuelta a Navarra, the Vuelta a León, the Vuelta a Palencia and Vuelta a Salamanca. In 2007, he made his professional debut with the Portuguese team Barbot-Halcon until 2008. In his first year there, he won a stage of the Volta a Portugal and he joined Contentpolis-Ampo in 2009. He joined the Greek cycling team Kastro Team in 2010 and Christina Watches-Dana in 2012 until 2013. On 31 December 2013, he announced his retirement from cycling at the end of the season after a six-year career.

Major results

2006
1st Stage 1 Vuelta a Navarra
1st Stage 4 Vuelta Ciclista a León
2007
1st Stage 2 Volta a Portugal
2008
1st Stages 3 & 5 Vuelta a Extremadura
1st Stage 1 GP CTT Correios de Portugal
1st Stages 4 & 5 Volta a Portugal
1st Stage 2 Grande Prémio Crédito Agrícola de la Costa Azul
2010
1st Circuito de Getxo
2012
3rd National Road Race Championships

References

External links 
Francisco José Pacheco at The Sports.org

1982 births
Living people
Spanish male cyclists
Sportspeople from the Province of Ciudad Real
Cyclists from Castilla-La Mancha